Maurice Constant Maria Hemelsoet (8 March 1875 – 29 December 1943) was a Belgian rower and was part of the 
Royal Club Nautique de Gand which won a Silver medal in men's eight at the 1900 Summer Olympics in Paris.

References

External links

1875 births
1943 deaths
Belgian male rowers
Olympic rowers of Belgium
Rowers at the 1900 Summer Olympics
Olympic silver medalists for Belgium
Olympic medalists in rowing
Medalists at the 1900 Summer Olympics
European Rowing Championships medalists
Royal Club Nautique de Gand rowers
19th-century Belgian people
20th-century Belgian people